Wormeley is a given name and surname. Notable people with the name include:

Ralph Wormeley Curtis (1854–1922), American painter and graphic artist
Caroline Wormeley Latimer (1860–1933), American physiologist and writer
Elizabeth Wormeley Latimer (1822–1904), English-American writer
Katherine Prescott Wormeley (1830–1908), American nurse in the Civil War

See also
Wormeley Cottage, aka the Wormeley-Montague House, a historic home at Urbanna, Middlesex County, Virginia
Warmley
Wormley (disambiguation)